Léon Zack (1892 – 1980), also known as Lev Vasilyevich Zak, was a Russian-born French figurative and later abstract painter and sculptor. He has been described as a School of Paris painter.

Biography
Léon Zack was born into a Jewish family in Nizhny Novgorod in Russia on 12 July 1892, to a pharmacist father. He was an illustrator, painter, designer and sculptor. He has been described a School of Paris painter. He was painting at the age of 13 and exhibiting his work by 15, being a pupil of Jakimchenko from 1905 to 1907. Whilst studying literature at the University of Moscow, he took painting and drawing classes at private academies where he studied under post-Impressionists such as Mashkov. After leaving Russia in 1920, he spent time in Florence, Rome and Berlin, before settling in Paris in 1923. Whilst in Berlin, he designed costumes and sets for the Ballets Romantiques Russes.

In 1926, Zack had his first one-man show in Paris, painting figures including harlequins and gypsies. He exhibited at the Salon d'Automne and the Salon des Indépendants and took French citizenship in 1938. He lived at Villefranche-sur-Mer during World War II. By 1947, he was back in Paris designing sets for the Opéra-Comique and in the 1950s he designed stained glass windows, including for Notre Dame des Pauvres at Issy-les-Moulineaux. Around this time Zack's work abandoned figuration for geometrical abstraction, gradually moving toward a more expressive mode of Tachisme. He had exhibitions of such abstract works at the Galerie Kléber in 1955 and 1957. At the end of his life, he lived on the outskirts of Paris and died in Vanves on 30 March 1980.

Zack has work in British national collections, including the Tate Collection, the Ashmolean Museum of Art and Archaeology and the Sainsbury Centre for Visual Arts at the University of East Anglia.

Selected exhibitions 

 from 1923: Salon d’Automne, Paris 
 1926: Galerie d’Art Contemporain, Paris
 1927: Galerie Percier, Paris
 1928: Art Institute of Chicago, Chicago
 1935: Galerie Wildenstein, Paris
 1946: Galerie Katia Granoff, Paris
 1959: Waddington Galleries, London
 1976: Léon Zack, Musée d'Art Moderne de la Ville de Paris, Paris
 1988: Léon Zack retrospective: 1892-1980, Musée des Beaux-Arts d'Orléans, Orléans
 2009: Musée d'Art et d'Histoire du Judaïsme, Paris

References

1892 births
1980 deaths
Artists from Nizhny Novgorod
20th-century French painters
20th-century French male artists
French male painters